The Siwi people or Siwan people, are a Berber ethnic group of about 24,000 native to Egypt's Siwa and Qara oases. They speak the Siwa language, a Berber language, spoken by about 20,000, along with Arabic. The Siwi are the most distant concentration of Berbers.

References

Berber peoples and tribes
Ethnic groups in Egypt